Mount Kinyeti is the highest peak in South Sudan. It is located in the Imatong Mountains in Ikwoto County of Eastern Equatoria, near the Ugandan border.
The group of high mountains that contain Kinyeti, extending to the border with Uganda, are sometimes called the Lomariti or Lolobai mountains.

The lower parts of the mountain were covered with lush forest.
These are the most northern forests of the East African montane forest ecoregion.
The summit is rocky, with montane grassland and scattered, low ericaceous scrubs, low subshrub and herbs in rock crevices.
One of the first Europeans to visit the mountain was the botanist Thomas Ford Chipp, who discovered Coreopsis chippii near the summit.

References

East African montane forests
Mountains of South Sudan
Geography of Eastern Equatoria
Highest points of countries